The Hirak Rif Movement or Rif Movement (meaning "Movement of the Rif") is a popular mass protest movement that took place in the Berber-speaking Rif region in northern Morocco between October 2016 and June 2017 as a result of the death of Mouhcine Fikri, a fishmonger who was crushed to death in a garbage truck after jumping in the back, following the confiscation of his allegedly illegal fish merchandise—of which he was selling on the local market—by local authorities.

The mass protest movement was met with repression, with many violent clashes between police and protesters in various cities and towns, such as the Al Hoceima, Driouch, Nador provinces and led to the arrest of more than 150 Moroccans, seen by the regime as protagonists/leaders or media activists in the movement.

The leader of the Rif mass protests, Nasser Zefzafi, was arrested by Moroccan law enforcement and intelligence operatives using telephone tracing technology on 29 May 2017, close to a beach near Al Hoceima. Right after his arrest, Zefzafi was flown in a military helicopter directly to Casablanca (560 km away), where he is being held and tried by a court of law for charges of sedition and conspiracy as of 10 March 2018. The Moroccan authorities chose to detain him away from his native city and his popular base to defuse the protest movement and to avoid mass escalations in his home city.

Background 
Mouhcine Fikri, a 31-year-old fish seller, was crushed to death in a rubbish bin on 28 October 2016 in the city of Al Hoceima after trying to recover his confiscated merchandise. This death led to a set of protests that were regularly held and included more and more demands. The protests were led by activist Nasser Zefzafi.

The protests were described as "the largest display of public anger in Morocco since the Arab spring in 2011."

Demands
The list of demands is the ground of the protests and includes:

 Respecting, preserving and protecting the distinct Berber identity and language of the Rif and the Riffians.
 Release of political prisoners.
 Serious inquiry and trial of those responsible for the death of Mohcine Fikri. 
 Demilitarisation of the Rif region.  
 Construction of a regional cancer hospital, university, library, theatre, roads and fish processing facilities.
 A say in how promised local investment money is spent.

Arrest of Nasser Zefzafi 
On 29 May 2017, Nasser Zefzafi was arrested in Al Hoceima. Following this arrest came hundred others. Following these arrests, daily protests began in Al Hoceima, Imzouren and other neighboring cities demanding the release of Zefzafi and the other activists.

Responses

Crackdowns 

On Monday 26 June, which coincided with the celebration of Eid el-Fitr, the  security forces (police, gendarmerie and auxiliary forces) launched a vast crackdown in Al Hoceima and the surrounding areas, to disband a planned march in solidarity with the detainees. This resulted in widespread violence and beating. The crackdown started early on the day of the feast by surrounding places of prayer, and preventing people from gathering in large numbers for the Eid's prayer. The gendarmerie and police then completely surrounded and blocked all accesses to the city of Al Hoceima, including patrolling the surrounding hills and mountains and stopping people trying to get to the city on foot. The police forces strictly prevented all cars and taxis from entering Al Hoceima, fearing a potential influx of protestors to the city from neighbouring populous areas such as Nador and El Aroui. The violence of the day resulted in the arrest of about 60 people, and many more unaccounted for and a large number of injuries amongst the population, also unaccounted for because of the media blockade. The government official press then published various stories in its media claiming that 39 members of police were injured.

Free speech crackdown 

A central person in the conflict about free speech is the journalist Hamid El Mahdaoui. Born in 1979, he graduated from college in 2004 and from the journalism institute in 2010. He worked in various publications, where he was known as a go-to-guy for sensitive issues that are generally avoided by the average reporter. He championed advocacy journalism, freely expressing his views and criticizing the government. He has also once said, "… a journalist has to shape public opinion by reporting the news but also by giving his own views." Since he launched the news site "Badil.info" in 2014, El Mahdaoui has become one of the most prominent faces in the media world in Morocco, not only because of his iconoclastic personality, but also because of a series of lawsuits that have been filed against him by various state security services and ministries.
In June 2016, a court in Casablanca sentenced him to a four-month suspended sentence and $1000 fine for defamation over his report on corruption by then-Minister of Justice. El Mahdaoui's journalism became more opinionated. Through critical reports and long format videos posted on his news site and on YouTube, his followers base grew with each video that gets viewed by several hundred thousands soon after its posting.
His profile continued to grow during the latest flare up of protests in the Rif, when he posted several critical videos supporting demands by the peaceful protesters and decrying repression by security forces. El Mahdaoui was eventually arrested, mistreated, denied health treatment, sentenced to three months then to one year in jail, and accused of a felony that will likely end up with a heavy sentence. Speaking on El Mahdaoui's arrest and mistreatment by Morocco's police, M. Aabid, a fellow reporter, said, "This is not about one single person, this is about the issue of freedom of expression." "El Mahdaoui has personified the idea that you can criticize the policies of the king without fear and the authorities don't like this idea."

Reactions

Domestic 
King Mohammed VI's only official direct response came in a communiqué read on Sunday 25 June 2017, by the spokesperson of the Palace, Abdelhak El Mrini. The king's statement was framed as part of a routine council of ministers, which the king presided over the same day. In this statement the king alluded to what he described as "delays" in a project he claims to have launched for the development of Al Hoceima in October 2015, while he was in Tétouan. The king then blamed his ministers for presenting projects to him which do not have realistic expectations and budgets, and added that "he would not allow those ministers to go on vacation this summer". The king then went on, in what looked like blame directed at the protestors, when he stressed that his "development and social projects should not be politicised".

The king's first direct response was when the issue was brought up by French President Emmanuel Macron, who visited him on 14 June. During the brief press conference held after Macron's arrival, the French President said that he questioned the king in a direct and frank manner about the turbulence in the Rif, and that he sensed in the king's response a "will that goes in the sense of appeasement and not escalation of the situation". Macron also reported that the king said to him, that "he inaugurated the practice of spending vacations in Al Hoceima", and the king claimed to Macron, that "contrary to other countries, people in the Rif were free to protest".

On 28 June 2017, speaking on behalf of the king, Prime Minister Saadeddine Othmani issued a video statement, in which he commended the king's directives to conduct development projects in all of Morocco, not just Al Hoceima, while he expressed his regrets regarding the crackdown of El Eid, and regretted the injured amongst the police and population. In the statement, Othmani also reported the king's wish for a very strict respect of the conditions of a fair trial of the 150 arrested in the Hirak, while also calling for respect of the law in dealing with claims of torture reported by the Rif detainees.

On 23 July 2017, in a speech commemorating his 18th anniversary of his ascension to the throne, King Muhammad VI rebuked local officials in northern Morocco for their failure to implement development projects in a timely manner. He also pardoned a number of activists who had been detained, including the singer Silya Ziani.

International 

It was reported that US Senator Tim Kaine issued a letter regarding the situation in Morocco in August 2017. In his letter, Kaine wrote that Moroccan citizens were "not fully protected with respect to expressing themselves, independent media outlets are significantly restricted, and members of the opposition are often unjustly targeted for their political beliefs." He also added, "In the past several months, tens of thousands of Moroccans joined protests calling for economic opportunity, political rights, and an end to corruption. In response, the government has arrested over 100 leaders of the protest movement. […] I am very concerned about these developments and strongly support the right of all people to peacefully express their grievances."

At international level, the repression of the Popular Movement to the Rif has had serious consequences on the population, forcing many young people to emigrate outside Morocco and this made the Riffian movement continue mainly in Europe where there is a large community of Riffian origin. On the other hand, the demands raised by the Popular Movement to Riff have given way to more political demands and where the thought of republican ideological tendency is penetrating more and more between the numerous and historical Riffian diaspora.

And at the European level, commissions to support the Riffian movement have been organized in different European cities, and over time more civil organizations are being created, both in solidarity and in defense of civil and political rights.

In July 2019 the First Riffian World Congress in Catalonia was organized.

See also 
 Nasser Zefzafi
 2011–2012 Moroccan protests

References

2016 in Morocco
2016 protests
2017 in Morocco
2017 protests
Aftermath of the Arab Spring
Riots and civil disorder in Morocco
Demonstrations
Protests in Morocco
Rif